Cardiacs Live is a live album by Cardiacs, recorded at the Paradiso in Amsterdam on 15 May 1988. The live photo on the back cover, however, appears to have been taken at The Town and Country Club in London.

A bootleg does exist with extra tracks that were unused on the official LP/CD.

Track listing 
All songs written by Tim Smith unless otherwise indicated.

Personnel
 Tim Smith – guitar and vocals
 Jim Smith – bass
 Sarah Smith – saxophone
 William D. Drake – keyboards
 Dominic Luckman – drums
 Tim Quy – percussion

References

Cardiacs live albums
1989 live albums